Armand Hammer (1898–1990) was an American industrialist.

Armand Hammer may also refer to:
 Armie Hammer (born 1986, as Armand Douglas Hammer), American actor, great-grandson of the industrialist
 Michael Armand Hammer (born 1955), American businessman, grandson of the industrialist
 Armand Hammer (music group), a New York hip hop group

See also
 Arm and hammer (disambiguation)

Hammer, Armand